Luisichthys is an extinct genus of ray-finned fish that lived in what is now Cuba from the Oxfordian to the early Tithonian stage of the Late Jurassic epoch. It contains one species, Luisichthys vinalesensis.

References

Crossognathiformes
Prehistoric ray-finned fish genera
Oxfordian genera
Tithonian genera
Late Jurassic fish
Jurassic fish of North America
Jurassic Cuba
Fossils of Cuba
Fossil taxa described in 1942